This article lists political parties in Trinidad and Tobago. Trinidad and Tobago has a de facto two-party system.

The People's National Movement (PNM) and the United National Congress (UNC) are the two biggest political parties, and have supplied every Prime Minister since 1991. The PNM has governed Trinidad and Tobago from 1956–86, 1991–95, and 2001 to 2010, and currently serves as the government since 2015. The UNC governed from 1995-2001 and from 2010-2015.

The Tobago-based Progressive Democratic Patriots (PDP) is the third biggest political party, with one assemblymember in the Tobago House of Assembly, since 2022. former PDP Independents currently govern the Tobago House of Assembly since 2022. The PNM is the only political party which contests elections in both Trinidad and Tobago.

Political parties with representation at a local or national level

Other parties with symbols registered with the Elections And Boundaries Commission (EBC)

 Progressive Empowerment Party
 Independent Liberal Party
 Movement for Social Justice
 Movement for National Development
 Congress of the People
 Democratic Party of Trinidad and Tobago
Trinidad and Tobago Democratic Front
New National Vision
Trinidad Humanity Campaign
National Organization of We the People
National Coalition for Transformation
Progressive Party
One Tobago Voice
Unrepresented Peoples Party
Unity of the People
The National Party
Port of Spain People's Movement
National Solidarity Assembly
Patriotic Front
Green Party

Defunct or dormant political parties
Parties which have won seats in elections are in bold.

National Alliance for Reconstruction
National Joint Action Committee
Democratic National Assembly
Democratic Development Party
The Organization Of Independent Candidates
Youth Empowerment Party
African National Congress
British Empire Citizens' and Workers' Home Rule Party
Caribbean National Labour Party
Caribbean People's Democratic Party
Communist Party of Trinidad and Tobago
Caribbean Socialist Party
Committee for Transformation and Progress
Citizens' Alliance
Class Action Reform Movement (CARM)
Curepe United People's Committee
Democratic Action Congress
Democratic Labour Party
Democratic Liberation Party 
Democratic National Alliance
Fargo House Movement
February 18 Movement
Liberal Party
Liberation Action Party
Movement for National Transformation
Movement for Social Transformation (MOTION)
Movement for Unity and Progress
National Democratic Alliance (Trinidad & Tobago)
National Democratic Organisation
National Democratic Party
National Development Party
National Freedom Party
National Liberation Movement (NLM)
National Progressive Party
National Team Unity
National Transformation Movement
National Transformation Party
Nationwide Transformation Movement
National Trinidad and Tobago Party
National Union of Freedom Fighters (NUFF)
Natural Law Party
New Beginning Movement (NBM)
Organisation for National Reconstruction 
Our Party
Party of Political Progress Groups
People's Democratic Party
People's Empowerment Party
People's Liberation Movement
People's Popular Movement
People's Republican Party
Point Fortin Vigilante Welfare Group
Political Progress Groups
Progressive Democratic Party
Progressive Workers Democrat Movement
Republican Party of Trinidad and Tobago
Seukeran Independent Party
Social Democratic Labour Party of Trinidad and Tobago
Socialist Alternative
Summit of People's Organisations (SOPO)
Tapia House Movement
Tobago Organisation of the People
Trinidad Labour Party
Trades Union Council
Trades Union Council and Caribbean Socialist Party
The Mercy Society
The People's Voice
United Country Group, St Andrew-St. David
United Front
United Labour Front
United Revolutionary Organization (URO)
Young People's National Party
West Indian Independence Party
West Indian National Party
West Indian Political Congress Movement
Workers and Farmers Party

We
See

 Politics of Trinidad and Tobago
 List of political parties by country

References
 Matthias Catón: "Trinidad and Tobago" in: Elections in the Americas. A Data Handbook, vol. 1, ed. by Dieter Nohlen. Oxford University Press, Oxford, 2005: pp. 627–646 
 Kirk Meighoo: Politics in a Half Made Society: Trinidad and Tobago, 1925-2002, 2003 
 Perry Mars: Ideology and Change: The Transformation of the Caribbean Left, Detroit, MI: Wayne State University Press, 1998. 230p.

Specific

Trinidad and Tobago
 
Political parties
Political parties